David Bull may refer to:
 David Bull (television presenter) (born 1969), English politician and television personality 
 David Bull (craftsman) (born 1951), Canadian artist specializing in Japanese woodblock printmaking
 David Bull (Scouting) (born 1944), English former Chairman of European Scout Region 
 David Roger Bull (born 1957), English professor of electronic engineering